San Francesco di Paola may refer to:

 Francis of Paola (1416–1507), Italian mendicant friar, founder of the Roman Catholic Order of Minims
 San Francesco di Paola Bridge, Cosenza, Italy

Churches in Italy
 San Francesco di Paola ai Monti, Rome
 San Francesco di Paola, Florence
 San Francesco di Paola, Lentini
 San Francesco di Paola, Milan
 San Francesco di Paola, Naples
 San Francesco da Paola, Oria
 San Francesco di Paola, Palermo
 San Francesco da Paola, Turin
 San Francesco di Paola, Venice